Peggy Shaw (1905–1990) was an American film actress of the silent era. Prior to her film career she had appeared in the shows of Florenz Ziegfeld.

Selected filmography
 A Stage Romance (1922)
 Who Are My Parents? (1922)
 My Friend the Devil (1922)
 The Custard Cup (1923)
 Skid Proof (1923)
 Does It Pay? (1923)
 The Grail (1923)
 The Plunderer (1924)
 In Hollywood with Potash and Perlmutter (1924)
 Winner Take All (1924)
 Gold Heels (1924)
 The Fighting Demon (1925)
 Subway Sadie (1926)
 Hoof Marks (1927)
 His Rise to Fame (1927)
 The Little Buckaroo (1928)
 The Ballyhoo Buster (1928)

References

Bibliography
 Solomon, Aubrey. The Fox Film Corporation, 1915-1935: A History and Filmography. McFarland, 2011.

External links

1905 births
1990 deaths
American film actresses
American silent film actresses
20th-century American actresses
Actresses from Pittsburgh